The 39th Kerala Film Critics Association Awards, honouring the best Malayalam films released in 2015, were announced in May 2016.

Winners

Main Awards 
 Best Film: Ennu Ninte Moideen
 Best Actor: Prithviraj (Ennu Ninte Moideen)
 Best Actress: Parvathy (Ennu Ninte Moideen, Charlie)
 Best Director: R. S. Vimal (Ennu Ninte Moideen)
 Second Best Film: Kaattum Mazhayum
 Best Popular Film: Charlie and Oru Vadakkan Selfie
 Best Children's Film: 'Akashangalkappuram, Vikalpam
 Best Child Artists: Vishal Krishna and Janaki Menon (Maalgudi Days)
 Second Best Actor: Prem Prakash (Nirnayakam)
 Second Best Actress: Lena (Ennu Ninte Moideen)
 Best Screenplay: Lenin Rajendran (Edavappathy)
 Best Lyricist: Antony Abraham (Ormakalil Oru Manjukaalam)
 Best Music Director: M. Jayachandran (Nirnayakam, Ennu Ninte Moideen)
 Best Male Playback Singer: P. Jayachandran (Ennu Ninte Moideen)
 Best Female Playback Singer: K. S. Chithra (Ormakalil Oru Manjukaalam)
 Best Cinematographer: Jomon T. John (Neena, Ennu Ninte Moideen)
 Best Editor: Mahesh Narayanan (Nirnayakam)
 Best Art Director: Jayasree Lakshmi Narayanan (Charlie)
 Best Make-up: Jayachandran (Edavappathy)
 Best Costume Designer: Sameera Saneesh (Edavappathy)
 Best Debut Actor: Utthara Unni (Edavappathy)
 Best Debut Directors: Sateesh Babu Senen and Santhosh Babu Senen (Chayam Poosiya Veedu)
 Best Costume Design: Sameera Saneesh (Edavappathy)

Special Awards 
 Socially Relevant Film: Ramprasad (Arani)
 Sanskrit Film: Vinod Mankara (Priyamanasam)

Special Jury Awards 
 Special Jury Award – Film: Jayaram Kailas (Akkaldhamayile Pennu)
 Special Jury Award – Acting: Asif Ali(Nirnayakam)
 Special Jury Award – Acting: Sudheer Karamana (Nirnayakam, Ennu Ninte Moideen, Akkaldhamayile Pennu)
 Special Jury Award – Cinematography: Ayyappan N. (Mallanum Mathevanum)
 Special Jury Award – Singing: Shilpa Raj

Honourary Awards 
 Chalachitra Ratnam Award: Innocent
 Chalachitra Prathibha Award: Kaviyoor Sivaprasad, Bichu Thirumala, Mallika Sukumaran

References

External links
 "List of recipients of the Kerala Film Critics Association Awards" (in Malayalam)

2015 Indian film awards
2015